Selwyn N. Owen (July 5, 1836 – October 1, 1916) was a Democratic lawyer in the U.S. State of Ohio who was a judge on the Ohio Supreme Court 1883–1889.

Selwyn N. Owen was born at Steuben County, New York, before his family moved to Columbus, Ohio, and then Huron County, Ohio in 1837. He attended school in Norwich Township, and Norwalk Academy. He attended Antioch College until 1856, and then was principal of a seminary in Clark County, Kentucky. He returned to Norwalk in 1857, where he read law in the offices of Cortland Kennon and Gideon T. Stewart. He enrolled in Cincinnati Law School in 1861, and graduated in 1862.

Selwyn N. Owen was admitted to the bar in 1862 and began practice in Fremont, Ohio. In 1863 he moved to Bryan, Ohio, where he had a large practice. In 1876, he was elected to the Common Pleas bench, and was re-elected in 1881.

In 1883, he was nominated by the Democrats for an Ohio Supreme Court seat, and defeated Republican John H. Doyle. William H. Upson resigned December of that year, and Owen was appointed to fill the vacancy. He began his five-year term in February 1884, serving until February 1889. In the 1888 election, the Democrats nominated Lyman R. Critchfield, who lost.

Owen entered into private practice with the firm Powell, Owen, Ricketts and Black when his Supreme judgeship ended. In 1897, he was appointed Director of Law of the city of Columbus by Mayor Samuel Luccock Black, his old law partner, and served two years. In 1899, Ohio Governor Bushnell appointed Owen to the Ohio State Board of Arbitration, and he was re-appointed in 1905 by Governor Myron T. Herrick. He declined appointment from Judson Harmon to a third term, and resigned January 3, 1911.

Owen married Beulah B. Barrett of Rochelle, Illinois in 1870. He owned a large home in Bryan and a 75-acre farm near the city as well as a home in Columbus. He was a Mason and a member of the Universalist Church. Two years after retirement, he and his wife moved to Portland, Oregon, to be near their daughter, and he died there.

Notes

References

Justices of the Ohio Supreme Court
Ohio Democrats
Lawyers from Columbus, Ohio
1836 births
University of Cincinnati College of Law alumni
1916 deaths
Antioch College alumni
People from Bryan, Ohio
Death in Oregon
19th-century American judges
19th-century American lawyers